Fountain Spring is a spring in Tulare County used in the 19th century for domestic and garden water supply.
Fountain Springs was a settlement established in Tulare before 1855, at the junction of the Stockton - Los Angeles Road and the road to the Kern River gold mines. From 1858 to 1861, Fountain Springs was a station on the Butterfield Overland Mail route, 14 miles southeast of Tule River Station and 12 miles north of Mountain House.  The site of the settlement was  miles northwest of the California Historical Landmark NO. 648 on the southwest corner of County Roads J22 and M 109 (old Springville Stage Route), in Tulare County, California.

References

Reference bibliography 

Former settlements in Tulare County, California
Ghost towns in California
Populated places established in 1854
Butterfield Overland Mail in California
1854 establishments in California
Stagecoach stops in the United States